John Donald Gaudion (23 July 1910 – 24 August 1993) was an  Australian rules footballer who played with North Melbourne and Geelong in the Victorian Football League (VFL).

Family
The son of John Richard Gaudion (1878–1914), and Margaret Robina Parkhill Gaudion (1884–1964), née Cunningham, John Donald Gaudion was born at Footscray, Victoria on 23 July 1910.

He was the uncle of North Melbourne player Michael Gaudion (1938–2021), the brother of North Melbourne footballer Charles Henry "Charlie" Gaudion (1904–1979), and  the nephew of Collingwood footballer Francis Charles "Frank" Gaudion (1882–1952).

Notes

External links 

1910 births
1993 deaths
Australian rules footballers from Melbourne
North Melbourne Football Club players
Geelong Football Club players
Yarraville Football Club players
People from Footscray, Victoria